Peggy Lamm is an American non-profit administrator and former politician who served as a member of the Colorado House of Representatives from 1994 to January 1997. She was a candidate for Colorado's 7th congressional district seat, in 2006 losing in the Democratic primary election to Ed Perlmutter by a margin of 38% to 53%.

Career 
Lamm was a member of the Colorado House of Representatives from 1994 to January 1997. She was also a former school teacher and activist.

While working at the Bighorn Center for Public Policy, Lamm was instrumental in passing the popular Colorado Telemarketing No-Call List. She was also chair of the Colorado Commission on Higher Education and investigated the University of Colorado football/sex scandal. Lamm has also served on numerous boards and commissions including the University of Colorado's Health Sciences Center for Ethics, Humanities and the Law, Hospice of Boulder County, and the National Center for Atmospheric Research Advisory Board. She is currently chair of the board of trustees of Adams State University and worked as a senior program manager at the National Democratic Institute for International Affairs.

In 2016, Lamm became the vice president of development at HopeWest, a non-profit organization based in Grand Junction, Colorado.

Personal life 
Lamm was the sister-in-law of Colorado Governor Richard Lamm and journalist Dottie Lamm.

References

Living people
Democratic Party members of the Colorado House of Representatives
Women state legislators in Colorado
Year of birth missing (living people)
Candidates in the 2006 United States elections
21st-century American women politicians